The Swinomish are a Native American people of Washington state in the United States.

Swinomish may also refer to:

Swinomish Indians of the Swinomish Reservation of Washington, a federally recognized Swinomish tribe in Washington state
Swinomish language, the language of the Swinomish people
Swinomish Channel, a waterway in Washington state